The Roman Catholic Diocese of Tarija is a diocese located in the city of Tarija in the Ecclesiastical province of Sucre in Bolivia.

History
 November 11, 1924: Established as Diocese of Tarija from the Metropolitan Archdiocese of La Plata

Leadership (in reverse chronological order)
 Bishops of Tarija (Roman rite)
 Bishop Jorge Ángel Saldías Pedraza, O.P. (2019.10.11 - ...)
 Bishop Francisco Javier Del Río Sendino (2006.01.10 – 2019.10.11)
 Bishop Adhemar Esquivel Kohenque (1995.10.20 – 2004.06.02)
 Bishop Abel Costas Montaño (1974.12.11 – 1995.10.20)
 Bishop Juan Niccolai, O.F.M. (1947.08.16 – 1974)
 Bishop Ramón Font y Farrés, C.M.F. (1924.11.17 – 1947.08.16)

Coadjutor bishops
Juan Niccolai, O.F.M. (1944-1947)
Adhemar Esquivel Kohenque (1992-1995)

See also
Roman Catholicism in Bolivia

References

External links
 GCatholic.org

Roman Catholic dioceses in Bolivia
Christian organizations established in 1924
Roman Catholic dioceses and prelatures established in the 20th century
Tarija, Roman Catholic Diocese of
1924 establishments in Bolivia